Competition is a 1915 short film produced by the American Film Manufacturing Company, released by Mutual Film, directed by B. Reeves Eason and Tom Ricketts and starring Charlotte Burton. It was Eason's directional debut, and he also acted in it.

Cast
 Charlotte Burton 
 B. Reeves Eason (as Reaves Eason)
 Jack Richardson
 Vivian Rich
 Harry von Meter (as Harry Van Meter)

External links

1915 films
1915 short films
1915 directorial debut films
American silent short films
American black-and-white films
American Film Company films
Films directed by B. Reeves Eason
1910s American films